TV Acres was a website collecting information about characters, places, and things that have appeared on American television programs broadcast from the 1940s through today.  The website and its publishing imprint, TV Acres Books, was established by Jerome Holst, a former librarian who now lives in Stockport, Ohio.  The website was named a "hot site" by USA Today in 2003.

References

External links 
 TV Acres

Television websites
Television in the United States
Internet properties established in 2001